Pierrette Glotin (26 November 1933 – 8 February 1994) was a French athlete who specialises in the long jump. Glotin competed at the 1952 Summer Olympics.

References

External links
 

French female long jumpers
Olympic athletes of France
French people of Martiniquais descent
Athletes (track and field) at the 1952 Summer Olympics
1933 births
1994 deaths